Mi camino es amarte is a Mexican telenovela that aired on Las Estrellas from 7 November 2022 to 12 March 2023. The series is produced by Nicandro Díaz González. It is an adaptation of the Chilean telenovela El camionero, created by Luis López Aliaga. It stars Susana González, Gabriel Soto, Mark Tacher and Ximena Herrera.

Plot 
Memo Santos Pérez (Gabriel Soto) makes a living driving his trailer. In addition to being loving to his family, he wants to form a home with Úrsula (Sara Corrales), a woman with a dark past whom he has just proposed to. When his life plans are underway, Olivia (Claudia Álvarez, his ex-girlfriend, on the verge of death, confesses to him that they had a daughter (Camille Mina) and asks him to look for her at the home of Daniela Gallardo (Susana González) and Fausto Beltran (Mark Tacher), Isabella's adoptive parents. Memo goes to the Beltrán family's house to meet his daughter, where he is mistaken for Daniela's new assistant.

Daniela is successful a landscape designer who has been unable to fulfill her dream of carrying a child in her womb. Memo decides to work with Daniela to be close to Isabella, while he confirms with a DNA test that he is her father. Thanks to the daily coexistence, Memo becomes Daniela's confidant and that is how he discovers the loneliness she lives in her marriage and that her only reason in life is Isabella. Daniela and Memo begin to fall in love, but they decide to keep their feelings quiet in order to respect their commitments to their partners.

Cast

Main 
 Susana González as Daniela Gallardo
 Gabriel Soto as Guillermo "Memo" Santos Pérez
 Mark Tacher as Fausto Beltrán
 Ximena Herrera as Karen Zambrano
 Sara Corrales as Úrsula Hernández
 Mónika Sánchez as Amparo Santos
 Sergio Reynoso as Humberto Santos
 Leonardo Daniel as Eugenio Zambrano
 Fabián Robles as Aarón Peláez
 Alfredo Gatica as César Ramírez
 Camille Mina as Isabella Beltrán
 André Sebastián as José María "Chema" Hernández
 Ara Saldívar as Jesusa "Chuchita" Galván
 Julián Figueroa as Leonardo Santos
 María Prado as Nélida
 Araceli Adame as Berenice
 Karla Esquivel as Gabriela "Gaby" Hernández
 Rodrigo Brand as Juan Pablo "Juanpa" Gallardo
 Diana Haro as Guadalupe "Lupita" Hernández
 Carlos Said as Sebastián Zambrano
 Alberto Estrella as Macario Hernández
 Gabriela Zamora as Yolanda
 Maya Tierrablanca as Graciela "Grace"
 Nicole Curiel as Estefanía Maldonado

Recurring and guest stars 
 Claudia Álvarez as Olivia
 Íngrid Martz as Martina
 Mónica Port as Claudia Altamirano
 Marco Uriel as Dr. Óscar Villalba
 Archie Lafranco as Jorge Altamirano
 Víctor Alfredo Jiménez as Roshi
 Jorge Ugalde as Arturo Robles
 Rossana San Juan as Zulema
 Martha Julia as Marisol

Production 
In May 2022, it was reported that Nicandro Díaz González was producing an adaption of the Chilean telenovela El camionero, and that casting had begun. On 6 July 2022, Gabriel Soto, Susana González, Mark Tacher and Ximena Herrera were announced in the lead roles, with the working title of the telenovela being Los caminos del amor. Filming of the telenovela began on 25 July 2022. On 23 August 2022, during a blessing ceremony, Mi camino es amarte was announced as the official title of the telenovela. Filming concluded in January 2023.

Ratings 
 
}}

Episodes

Notes

References

External links 
 

2022 telenovelas
2022 Mexican television series debuts
2023 Mexican television series endings
2020s Mexican television series
Televisa telenovelas
Mexican telenovelas
Spanish-language telenovelas
Mexican television series based on Chilean television series